Alexander Justin Bruce Horvath (born February 26, 1998) is a Canadian curler from Victoria, British Columbia. He is a former World and Canadian Junior champion.

Career
Horvath first curled competitively on the national level at the 2014 Canadian Junior Curling Championships. That season, Horvath played lead on the Cameron de Jong rink that won the BC Junior men's title. Representing British Columbia at the Canadian Juniors, the de Jong-led rink finished the event with a 5–5 record.  

Horvath joined the two-time Canadian Junior and defending World Junior champion Tyler Tardi rink in 2018, playing lead on the team. The rink began the season by winning the 2018 King Cash Spiel World Curling Tour event. Later on in the season, the team won another provincial junior title. At the 2019 Canadian Junior Curling Championships, the team won championship, Horvath's lone national junior title, but the third-straight for Tardi. The team lost just one game en route to the title, and defeated Manitoba's J.T. Ryan in the final. The team represented Canada at the 2019 World Junior Curling Championships. After posting a 7–2 round robin record, they won both playoff games, including defeating Switzerland's Marco Hösli rink in the final. The team played in the 2019 BC Men's Curling Championship as well that season, where they were eliminated after posting a 2–3 record. The team wrapped up the season by playing in the 2019 Champions Cup Grand Slam event, which they qualified for by winning the World Juniors that season. There, the team went win-less in their four matches. 

Horvath also won a BC Mixed Championship in 2019, throwing second on a team skipped by Cameron de Jong. The team represented British Columbia at the 2020 Canadian Mixed Curling Championship, going 5-5.  

The 2019-20 curling season would have been the team's last year of junior eligibility, but they decided to make the jump to men's curling full-time, eschewing the junior ranks. In their first post-junior season, Team Tardi won the 2019 Prestige Hotels & Resorts Curling Classic on the World Curling Tour. The team also made the playoffs at the 2020 BC Men's Curling Championship, where they lost in the final to Jim Cotter. The season abruptly ended due to the COVID-19 pandemic, and Horvath was replaced by Jason Ginter on the team for the following abbreviated season.  

Horvath joined the Jacques Gauthier rink for the 2022-23 curling season. In their first season together, the team won the 2023 BC Men's Curling Championship and represented British Columbia at the 2023 Tim Hortons Brier. At the Brier, the team finished with a 3-5 record.

Personal life
Horvath works as an ice technician at the Victoria and Esquimalt Curling Clubs. He began curling at age three, and has claimed he was conceived after his parents "drank too many paralyzers" at an Esquimalt curling tournament.

Outside of men's curling, Horvath coached the University of Victoria women's curling team in 2023.

References

 
Living people
1998 births
Curlers from British Columbia 
Canadian male curlers
Sportspeople from Victoria, British Columbia
Curling ice makers
Canadian curling coaches